GPC may refer to:

Science and medicine 
 Gel permeation chromatography
 Generalized polynomial chaos
 Giant papillary conjunctivitis, a disease of the eye
 Gigaparsec, a unit of distance
 Global Plant Clinic, an agricultural organization
 Glycophorin C, a sialoglycoprotein
 Glypican, a proteoglycan
 GPC Biotech, a German biopharmaceutical company

Politics 
 General People's Congress (disambiguation)
 Goa People's Congress, in India
 Green Party of Canada
 Group of Cameroonian Progressives

Other uses 
 Geiriadur Prifysgol Cymru, the University of Wales Dictionary of the Welsh language
 Gene Polisseni Center, a college ice hockey arena on the campus of the Rochester Institute of Technology
 General Polygon Clipper, a graphics library
 Genuine Parts Company, an American service organization
 George Pearson Centre, a long-term care facility in Vancouver, Canada
 Georgia Perimeter College in Georgia, United States
 Global Privacy Control, a data protection signal for the web
 Global Product Classification
 Global Pound Conference, a conference series on international dispute resolution
 GNU Pascal, a computer program
 Goldwyn Pictures, an American film studio that eventually merged with other studios
Government Procurement Card, a United Kingdom government purchasing card
 Government Purchase Card, a United States government purchasing program
 GPC Sport, an auto racing team
 Putnam County Airport, in Indiana, United States
 Remington GPC, an American assault rifle
 GPC, a main character from Mystery Science Theater 3000.